The angiotensin II receptors, (ATR1) and (ATR2), are a class of G protein-coupled receptors with angiotensin II as their ligands. They are important in the renin–angiotensin system: they are responsible for the signal transduction of the vasoconstricting stimulus of the main effector hormone, angiotensin II.

Structure 
The AT1 and AT2 receptors share a sequence identity of ~30%, but have a similar affinity for angiotensin II, which is their main ligand.

Members

Overview table

AT1 

The AT1 receptor is the best elucidated angiotensin receptor.

Location within the body
The AT1 subtype is found in the heart, blood vessels, kidney, adrenal cortex, lung and circumventricular organs of brain, basal ganglia, brainstem and mediates the vasoconstrictor effects.

Mechanism
The angiotensin receptor is activated by the vasoconstricting peptide angiotensin II. The activated receptor in turn couples to Gq/11 and Gi/o and thus activates phospholipase C and increases the cytosolic Ca2+ concentrations, which in turn triggers cellular responses such as stimulation of protein kinase C. Activated receptor also inhibits adenylate cyclase and activates various tyrosine kinases.

Effects
Effects mediated by the AT1 receptor include vasoconstriction, aldosterone synthesis and secretion, increased vasopressin secretion, cardiac hypertrophy, augmentation of peripheral noradrenergic activity, vascular smooth muscle cells proliferation, decreased renal blood flow, renal renin inhibition, renal tubular sodium reuptake, modulation of central sympathetic nervous system activity, cardiac contractility, central osmocontrol and extracellular matrix formation.

AT2

AT2 receptors are more plentiful in the fetus and neonate. The AT2 receptor remains enigmatic and controversial – is probably involved in vascular growth. Effects mediated by the AT2 receptor are suggested to include inhibition of cell growth, fetal tissue development, modulation of extracellular matrix, neuronal regeneration, apoptosis, cellular differentiation, and maybe vasodilation and left ventricular hypertrophy. In humans the AT2 subtype is found in molecular layer of the cerebellum. In the mouse is found in the adrenal gland, amygdaloid nuclei and, in small numbers, in the paraventricular nucleus of the hypothalamus and the locus coeruleus.

AT3 and AT4
Other poorly characterized subtypes include the AT3 and AT4 receptors. The AT4 receptor is activated by the angiotensin II metabolite angiotensin IV, and may play a role in regulation of the CNS extracellular matrix, as well as modulation of oxytocin release.

See also 
 Angiotensin II receptor antagonist

References

External links 
 

G protein-coupled receptors